The Tiandong–Debao railway is a railway line in Baise, Guangxi, China. At its northern end, the line connects with the Nanning–Kunming railway. At its southern end, it connects with the Debao–Jingxi railway. The only station on the line that is open to passengers is Debao railway station.

History
The line opened on 23 July 2010. Passenger services were introduced on 29 January 2016.

References

Railway lines in China
Railway lines opened in 2010